Milija "Milo" Bakić and Pavle Bakić were two brothers from Andrijevica, in the Principality of Montenegro, who were students at the Galatasaray High School and co-founded the Galatasaray football club on October 30, 1905 with 11 fellow students. Born in the village of Zabrđe, near Andrijevica, the brothers studied in Constantinople, living with their uncle Mitar Bakić who was a consul in the Ottoman Empire. The brothers also finished military school, with the rank of officer, although at the beginning of the Balkan Wars, they returned to their country, then the Kingdom of Montenegro, and served in Janko Vukotić's Third Unit, in Cetinje. They fought in Macedonia, where Milija was killed in a battle near Kočani. Some still view him as the best Turkish footballer in history. A monument was erected in their home village, gifted by Galatasaray staff, on June 16, 2014.

References

Montenegrin footballers
Turkish footballers
Vasojevići
People from Andrijevica
Montenegrin soldiers
Montenegrin military personnel of the Balkan Wars
Galatasaray High School alumni
Sibling duos
Sports duos
20th-century Montenegrin people
20th-century Turkish people
Association footballers not categorized by position
Year of birth missing